Gergő Gengeliczki (born 8 June 1993) is a Hungarian football player who plays for Nyíregyháza.

Club statistics

Updated to games played as of 19 May 2019.

External links
Profile at MLSZ 

1993 births
Footballers from Budapest
Living people
Hungarian footballers
Association football defenders
Budapest Honvéd FC II players
Budapest Honvéd FC players
Nyíregyháza Spartacus FC players
Mezőkövesdi SE footballers
Dunaújváros PASE players
Soroksári TE footballers
MTK Budapest FC players
Győri ETO FC players
Nemzeti Bajnokság I players
Nemzeti Bajnokság II players